Hannah Lochner (born July 28, 1993) is a Canadian actress.

Career
Lochner has appeared in number of television series and made for-TV movies, including Life with Derek, Wild Card. She may be best known for her opening scene as Vivian in the 2004 film Dawn of the Dead.  She later starred on Wingin' It (2010–12).

Lochner graduated from Etobicoke School of the Arts in 2011.

Filmography

External links

1993 births
20th-century Canadian actresses
21st-century Canadian actresses
Actresses from Ontario
Canadian child actresses
Canadian film actresses
Canadian television actresses
Living people